Volnino is a rural locality (a village) in Borisoglebskoye Rural Settlement, Muromsky District, Vladimir Oblast, Russia. The population was 184 as of 2010. There are three streets.

Geography 
Volnino is located 16 km north of Murom (the district's administrative centre) by road. Borisogleb is the nearest rural locality.

References 

Rural localities in Muromsky District